Kachu or Kachow may refer to the following places:

 Kachu Rural District, in Isfahan Province, Iran
 Kachu-ye Bala, West Azerbaijan Province, Iran
 Kachu-ye Pain, West Azerbaijan Province, Iran

See also
 Kaju (disambiguation)